Trevelyan is a Welsh and Cornish name derived from a place-name which originally meant "farmstead 'trev' or Tref (town in Welsh) of Elyan".

General uses
 Trevelyan baronets
 Trevelyan College, Durham, England
 Trevelyan, an 1833 novel by Caroline Lucy Scott

People with the surname
 Anne-Marie Trevelyan (born 1969), British Conservative Party politician, Member of Parliament (MP) for Berwick upon Tweed since 2015
 Sir Charles Trevelyan, 1st Baronet (1807–1886), British civil servant
 Sir Charles Trevelyan, 3rd Baronet (1870–1958), British Member of Parliament
 Francis Trevelyan Buckland (1826–1880), English surgeon, zoologist, popular author and natural historian
 George Macaulay Trevelyan (1876–1962), British historian and university administrator
 Sir George Trevelyan, 2nd Baronet (1838–1928), British statesman and historian, as George Otto Trevelyan
 Sir George Trevelyan, 4th Baronet (1906–1996), British new age spiritualist 
 Humphrey Trevelyan, Baron Trevelyan (1905–1985), British diplomat and author
 John Trevelyan (disambiguation)
 Julian Trevelyan (1910–1988), English artist and poet
 Julian Trevelyan (pianist) (born 1998), British concert pianist
 Laura Trevelyan (born 1968), BBC journalist
 Mary Caroline Moorman (1905 - 1994) née Trevelyan, English historian
 R. C. Trevelyan (1872–1951), English poet and translator
 Raleigh Trevelyan (1923–2014), British author, editor and publisher
 Robert Trevelyan (cricketer) (born 1970), English former first-class cricketer
 Walter Trevelyan (1821–1894), English first-class cricketer and barrister

Characters
 Alec Trevelyan, a character in the James Bond movie GoldenEye
 Dr. Francis Trevelyan, a character in The Spy with a Cold Nose
 Dr. Trevelyan, a character in "The Adventure of the Resident Patient" by Arthur Conan Doyle
 Captain Trevelyan, a character in The Sittaford Mystery by Agatha Christie
 Louis Trevelyan, a character in He Knew He Was Right by Anthony Trollope
 Christian Trevelyan Grey, a character in Fifty Shades of Grey by EL James
 Kurt Trevelyan, a character in Halo: Ghosts of Onyx by Eric Nylund
 Trevelyan, a character who escaped the inundation of the sea when Lyonesse was engulfed
 Inquisitor Trevelyan, a potential player character in Dragon Age: Inquisition
 Colley Trevelyan, a character in "Sparrows in the Scullery" by Barbara Brooks Wallace
 Armand Trevelyan, a character in Isaac Asimov's novella "Profession"
 Maxim Trevelyan, character in The Mister by E. L. James.

People with the forename
Trevelyan Richards, coxswain of the RNLI lifeboat during the Penlee lifeboat disaster

Other 
 Trevelyan's char (Salvelinus colii) a cold-water fish

See also
Louise Trevillyan
Trevelin

Cornish-language surnames
Welsh-language surnames